Dnevne novine (English translation: Daily newspaper) is a Montenegrin daily newspaper. Its first editor and owner is Boris Darmanović, owner of Media Nea, a Montenegrin media agency.

History 
The paper was started on October 10, 2011, as the fourth Montenegrin daily newspaper (besides Pobjeda, Vijesti and Dan). It was advertised as an "anti-fascist and anti-nationalistic" newspaper, as a newspaper which promotes "social justice, tolerance and diversity and fights against corruption".

On May 7, 2012, Dnevne Novine became the first and, as of October 2012, only free newspaper in Montenegro. Željko Ivanović and Mladen Milutinović, owners of Vijesti and Dan, tried to sabotage the move by threatening to withdraw their papers from the main media distributors in the country (Tabacco, S Media and Štampa). Ivanović's and Milutinović's move was widely criticized by other media.

Since June 2012, the paper is available online at dnevne.me.

References 

Publications established in 2011
Newspapers published in Montenegro